Logba may refer to:
the Logba people
the Logba language